This is a list of notable people from Rajasthan, India.

Award winners from Rajasthan
 Padma Vibhushan
 Naresh Chandra, 2007
 Ram Narayan, 2005
 Man Mohan Sharma, 2001
 Kalu Lal Shrimali, 1976
 Nagendra Singh, 1973
 Daulat Singh Kothari, 1973
 Mohan Sinha Mehta, 1969
 Manikya Lal Varma, 1965
 Ghanshyam Das Birla, 1957
 Padma Bhushan
Komal Kothari, 2006
Vijay Shankar Vyas, 2006
Durga Lal, 2003
Jagat Singh Mehta, 2002
Ram Narain Agarwal, 2000
L. M. Singhvi, 1998
Narayan Singh Manaklao, 1991
M.V.Mathur, 1989
Natwar Singh, 1984
Jhabar Mal Sharma, 1982
Bhogilal Pandya, 1976
Ratan Shastri, 1975
 Narayandas Malkani, 1973
 Lt Gen Sagat Singh, 1972
Gokulbhai Bhatt, 1971
Prabhu Lal Bhatnagar, 1968
Manikya Lal Varma, 1965
Daulat Singh Kothari, 1962
Rao Raja Hanut Singh, 1958
 Padma Shri
Chandra Prakash Deval, 2011
Krishna Poonia, 2011
Arjun Prajapati, 2010
Vijaydan Detha, 2007
Rajyavardhan Singh Rathore, 2005
Veer Singh Mehta, 2005
Kanhaiyalal Sethia, 2004
Vishwa Mohan Bhatt, 2002
Mohammed Tayab Khan, craftmanship, 2001
Vaidya Suresh Chaturvedi, 2000
Kailash Sankhala, The Tiger Man Of India, 1992
Sriram Singh Shekhawat, in 1992
Kudrat Singh, 1988
Hisam-ud-din Usta, 1986, arts
Mag Raj Jain, 1989, social work
Lashmi Kumari Chundawat, 1984
Purushottam Das, 1984, Arts
Ram Gopal Vijayvargiya, 1984, painting
 Dafadar Raghubir Singh (Equestrian), 1983
Allah Jilai Bai, 1982
Shree Lal Joshi
Raghubir Singh, 1983
P. K . Sethi
 Sita Ram Lalas, 1977, literature
Kripal Singh Shekhawat, 1974
Vijay Singh, 1972, civil service
Khailshanker Durlabhji, 1971, trade and industry
Yudhvir Singh, 1971, social work
Ratna Fabri, 1970, arts
Devi Lal Samar, 1968, arts
Sis Ram Ola, for social work in 1968
Kanwar Sain, 1956
Ratan Shastri, 1955
Sudhir Tailang
Magsaysay Award
Rajendra Singh
P. K . Sethi
Sardar Patel Lifetime Achievement International Award (Sardar Ratna)
Dr. D.P. Sharma, 2015
Lalit Kala Akademi Fellowship
Ram Gopal Vijayvargiya
 Rashtrapati Award
 Kala Nath Shastry, 1998
Red and White Godfrey Phillips National Bravery Awards
Dr. D.P. Sharma, 2001

Gallantry honors

Param Vir Chakra
CHM Piru Singh Shekhawat (Jhunjhunu)
Major Shaitan Singh Bhati

Maha Vir Chakra
Brigadier Bhawani Singh of Jaipur
Lt. Col Kishan Singh Rathore (Ghadsisar, Bikaner)
Naik Digendra Kumar
Lt. Gen. Hanut Singh, 1971

Ashoka Chakra
 Defedar Sultan Singh Rathore (Mamdola-Didwana)
 2nd Lt. Puneet Nath Dutt, Jaipur

Kirti Chakra
 Captain Karni Singh Rathore (Later on Promoted to Colonel) Lakhau, Churu
 Havaldar Amar Singh Rathore (Ramdawas, Jodhpur)]
Colonel Saurabh Singh Shekhawat (21 Para Commando, Special Forces)

Shaurya Chakra
Colonel Saurabh Singh Shekhawat, 21 Para Commando (Special Forces) - Village: Dhani Daulat Singh, Alwar

Vir Chakra
Squadron Leader Ajay Ahuja
Naib Sub. Rampal Singh (Kotputli Jaipur), 9 Rajput, 1999

Sena Medal

 Colonel Saurabh Singh Shekhawat (21 Para Commando, Special Forces)
 Major Bhanu Pratap Singh (8 Rajputana Rifles / 43 Rashtriya Rifles)

Vishisht Seva Medal
 Major Surendra Poonia (Rajpura, Sikar)-Special Forces, President's Bodyguard, AMC, World Medical Games
 Colonel Saurabh Singh Shekhawat (21 Para Commando, Special Forces)

Business and industry
Ghanshyam Das Birla
Lakshmi Mittal
Jamnalal Bajaj
H S Ranka
Chanda Kochhar
Harakh Chand Nahata
Motilal Oswal of Motilal Oswal securities
Desh Bandhu Gupta of Lupin Laboratories

Defence
Abhey Singh 
 Lt. Gen. K. Bhadur Singh (retd.)
Lt Gen (Retd) Ajai Singh,  PVSM, A VSM
Lt Gen Sagat Singh from (Village Moda), Churu district the hero of 1971 Bangladesh War
Lt. General Nathu Singh Rathore (Gumanpura, Dungarpur) - 1st Lt. General of Indian Army
Colonel Saurabh Singh Shekhawat KC, SC, VSM, SM (21 Para Special Forces) Village: Dhani Daulat Singh, Alwar

Judiciary and law

Chief Justice of Supreme Court of India
Rajendra Mal Lodha, Chief Justice of India

Chief Justice of Rajasthan High Court

Daulat Mal Bhandari
Chand Mal Lodha

Chief Justice of Other High Courts
Mohan Lall Shrimal
Guman Mal Lodha
Dalveer Bhandari

Judges of Rajasthan High Court
Kan Singh Parihar
Milap Chand Jain
Rajendra Mal Lodha

Jurists
L. M. Singhvi
Dalveer Bhandari

Eminent scholars

Scientists
Brahmagupta
Daulat Singh Kothari
Rajendra Singh Paroda
Rajpal Singh Yadav, Vector ecologist
Laxman Singh Rathore, DG Meteorology
DP Sharma, Computer and IT scientist
Govardhan Mehta, Chemical scientist 
PK Sethi, Medical orthopedics

Medicine
P. K. Sethi
Veer Singh Mehta
Hakim Syed Karam Husain, Unani practitioner
Tirath Das Dogra, Former Director AIIMS, Vice Chancellor SGT University, Gurgaon.

Historical figures
Meerabai
Panna Dhai
Gora and Badal
Hada Rani
Bhamashah
Rani Padmini
Narharidas Barhath
Adho Duraso OR Arha Dursa, Panchetiya, Pali
Kaviraja Bankidas Ashiya
 Maharana Pratap
Rana Sanga
Suryamal Misran
Kaviraja Shyamaldas

Journalism
 Karpoor Chand Kulish, founder of Rajasthan Patrika
 Ved Pratap Vaidik
 Pratap Bhanu Mehta

Administration

D.R. Mehta, ex chairman of SEBI,
Gyan Prakash Pilania
Kunwar Natwar Singh

Literature

Dursa Arha
Kaviraja Bankidas Ashiya
Narharidas Barhath
Suryamal Misran
Magha (poet)
Sunderdas
Lashmi Kumari Chundawat
Kanhaiyalal Sethia
Nand Kishore Acharya
Acharya Rajendrasuri
Abdul Vaheed `Kamal'
Vijaydan Detha
Bhatt Mathuranath Shastri (Sanskrit poet)
Kala Nath Shastry (Sanskrit scholar)
Hemant Shesh (Hindi poet)
Mandan Mishra (Sanskrit scholar)
Shyamaldas
Vidyadhar Shastri
Thakur Akshay Singh Ratnu
Chandra Prakash Deval
Rima Hooja

Arts

 Suvigya Sharma
Reshma
Gulabo (Kalbelia dancer)

Music
Ahmed and Mohammed Hussain
Allah Jilai Bai
Aminuddin Dagar
Raj Kamal
Ananya Birla
Brij Bhushan Kabra
Chatur Lal
Ila Arun
Jagjit Singh
Mehdi Hassan
Moinuddin Khan, sarangi player
Nasir Moinuddin Dagar, Dhrupad vocalist
Raja Hasan
Sandeep Acharya
Shreya Ghoshal
Shail Hada
Toshi Sabri
Vishwa Mohan Bhatt
Wasifuddin Dagar
Zia Fariddudin Dagar
Zia Mohiuddin Dagar
Khemchand Prakash
Brij Lal Verma
Sultan Khan  (Sarangi player and classical vocalist)
Roop Kumar Rathod  (Singer)
Shravan Kumar  (music composer-Nadeem Shravan)
Bhanu Pratap Singh
Malini Rajurkar
Krishna Bhatt

Dance
Puran Bhatt
Manisha Gulyani

Painting
B. G. Sharma
Shree Lal Joshi
Archibald Herman Muller
Ramkishan Adig

Art craft and handicrafts
Kripal Singh Shekhawat, blue pottery
Badri Lal Chitrakar, Shilp Guru award
Mohanlal Chaturbhuj Kumhar
Vibhor Sogani, Sprouts
Usha Rani Hooja
Jagdish Lal Raj Soni
Beni Ram Soni

Film industry

 Arjun Deo Charan

Bharat Vyas
Tarachand Barjatya (Rajshri productions)
Om Shivpuri
Mani Kaul (director)
Hasrat Jaipuri
Jagjit Singh (singer)
Irrfan Khan
Karmveer Choudhary (actor)
Asrani (actor)
Mahipal
Pinchoo Kapoor
K. C. Bokadia
Sultan Khan  (Bollywood classical singer)
Annu Kapoor  (actor, anchor)
Kovid Gupta (screenwriter, filmmaker)
Smita Bansal (Balika Vadhu Fame)
Sakshi Tanwar (Bade acche lagte hai/Kahani Ghar Gharki fame)
Ashish Sharma

Others
Raj Singh Dungarpur
Hanuman Prasad Poddar
Chanda Kochhar
Bhanwari Devi, social worker
Falahari Baba

Independence movement
Thakur Kesari Singh Barhath
Kunwar Pratap Singh Barhath
Thakur Zorawar Singh Barhath
Rao Gopal Singh Kharwa
Lothoo Nitharwal
Sagarmal Gopa
Bharat Pratap Singh
Daulat Mal Bhandari
Swami Keshwanand
Har Lal Singh
Vijay Singh Pathik
Rao Tula Ram

Religion

 Karni Mata
Guru Jambheshwar
Devnarayan
Baba Ramdevji
Mata Rani BhatiyaniJasol
Gogaji
Pabuji
Mahatma Isardas
Jambhoji
Dadu Dayal
Brahmanand Swami
Dhanna Bhagat
Karmabai
Mirabai
Tejaji
Acharya Rajendrasuri
Acharya Mahaprajna
Khetlaji
Swarupadas
Keshavrai

Rulers
Amar Singh Rathore, king of Nagore
Badan Singh
Bappa Rawal, king of  Mewar
Durga Das Rathore
Ganga Singh, king of Bikaner
Hammiradeva of Ranthambore- grandson of Prithvi Raj Chauhan
Hammir Singh, king of Mewar
Jai Singh I, king of Jaipur
Jai Singh II, king of Jaipur
Jaswant Singh, king of Jodhpur
Kanhadadeva, king of Jalore
Maharao Shardul Singh 
Maharana Pratap, king of Mewar
Man Singh I, king of Jaipur
Prithvi Raj Chauhan, king Ajmer
Raja Nahar Khan, king of Mewat
Rana Kumbha, king Mewar
Rana Sanga, king of Mewar
Rao Jodha, king of Jodhpur
Rao Bika, king of Bikaner
Rawal Mallinath
Rao Shekhaji
Suraj Mal
Udai Singh II, king of Mewar
Vigraharaja IV, King of Shakambhari
Viramadeva, king of Jalore

Politics

Rajya Sabha members
 List of Rajya Sabha members from Rajasthan

Ministers  —Rajasthan Government
 List of ministers in Government of Rajasthan

Vice President of India
Bhairon Singh Shekhawat

Governors of other states
Hari Dev Joshi
Mohan Lal Sukhadia (Governor of Karnataka, Tamil Nadu and Andhra Pradesh)
Mohammed Usman Arif
Sadiq Ali
Nawal Kishore Sharma
Sunder Singh Bhandari
Lt. Gen. K. Bhadur Singh (retd.)
Rajkumar Dhoot
Lt Gen (Retd) Ajai Singh, PVSM, A VSM, governor of Assam
Arvind Dave
Banwari Lal Joshi
Shiv Charan Mathur
Govind Singh Gurjar
Jagannath Pahadia
Kamla Beniwal

Chief ministers
Heera Lal Shastri
Jai Narayan Vyas
Mohan Lal Sukhadia
Barkatullah Khan
Hari Dev Joshi
Bhairon Singh Shekhawat
Jagannath Pahadia
Hira Lal Devpura
Shiv Charan Mathur
Ashok Gehlot
Tika Ram Paliwal
Hari Shankar Bhabhra, Deputy Chief Minister
Bhairon Singh Shekhawat, Chief Minister of Rajasthan three times, from 1977 to 1980, 1990 to 1992 and 1993 to 1998

Ministers — central government
Jaswant Singh, Former External Affairs, Defense & Finance Minister of India
Kalyan Singh Kalvi, Energy Minister of India.
Natwar Singh, Former External Affairs Minister of India
Nathuram Mirdha
Subhash Maharia
Satish Chandra Agrawal
Krishana Kumar Goyal
Girija Vyas
Rajesh Pilot
Ram Niwas Mirdha
Sis Ram Ola
Nawal Kishore Sharma
Mohammed Usman Arif
Gajendra Singh Shekhawat
Arjun Ram Meghwal
Rajyavardhan Singh Rathore
Bhupender Yadav
Kailash Meghwal
Jaskaur Meena
Kalu Lal Shrimali
Raj Bahadur
Sachin Pilot, Minister of State in the Ministry of Communications and Technology
Namo Narain Meena, Minister of State in the Ministry of Finance
Kirori Lal Meena
C.P. Joshi
Sanwar Lal Jat

Speakers of Rajasthan Legislative Assembly
Sumitra Singh
Poonam Chand Vishnoi
Parasram Maderna
Hari Shankar Bhabhra
Shanti Lal Chaplot
Laxman Singh of Dungarpur
Kailash Chandra Meghwal

Others
Gayatri Devi
Rawal Umed Singh Rathore Barmer
Mohar Singh Rathore
Jawan Singh
Daulat Mal Bhandari
Chaudhari Kumbharam Arya
Narendra Budania
Motilal Vora Ex chief minister of Madhya Pradesh
Devi Singh Bhati
Mamta Sharma
 Bhawani Singh of Pokhran (b. 1911) member 1st Lok Sabha

Sports

Khel Ratna award winner
Rajyavardhan Singh Rathore

Arjuna award winners

Basketball
Khushi Ram, in 1967
Hanuman Singh, in 1975
Radhey Shyam, in 1981
Ajmer Singh, in 1982

Athletics
Sriram Singh, in 1973
Gopal Saini, in 1981
Raj Kumar (athlete), in 1984
Deena Ram, in 1990

Volleyball
R K Purohit, in 1983
Suresh Mishra, in 1979

Hockey
Sunita Puri, in 1966
Varsha Soni, in 1981

Archery
Shyam Lal Meena, in 1989
Limba Ram, in 1991

Cricket
Salim Durani, in 1961
Pankaj Singh, in 2007 – present

Swimming
Manjari Bhargava, in 1974

Weightlifting
Mehar Chand Bhaskar, in 1985

Squash
Bhuvneshwari Kumari, in 1982

Shooting
Maharaja Karni Singh, in 1961
Rajyashree Kumari, in 1968
Bhuvaneshwari Kumari of Kota, in 1969
Bhim Singh II of Kota, in 1971
Rajyavardhan Singh Rathore, in 2003

Polo
Col. Maharaj Prem Singh, in 1961
Lt.Col Kishan Singh, in 1963
Rao Raja Hanut Singh, in 1964

Equestrian
Dafadar Raghubir Singh (Equestrian), in 1982
Col.G. M. Khan, VSM (Equestrian), in 1984

Golf
Lakshman Singh, in 1982

Paralympics
Devendra Jhajharia
Avani Lekhara
Krishna Nagar

Others
Parthasarathy Sharma, Cricket
Hanumant Singh, Cricket
Vikram Solanki, Cricket
Gajendra Singh Shaktawat, Cricket
Gangotri Bhandari, Ladies hockey
Abhijeet Gupta, Chess
Krishna Poonia
Bajranglal Takhar
Hari Singh (athlete), marathon runner
Ambika Dutt Ranga, Football
Surendra Poonia, Power-lifting

Dronacharya award winners
Guru Hanuman, for wrestling
Maha Singh Rao, for wrestling in 2006
R. D. Singh, for Athletics in 2007

List of members of the Constituent Assembly from Rajasthan as at 14 November 1949
V.T. Krishnamachari
Heera Lal Shastri
Raj Bahadur
Manikya Lal Varma
Lt. Col. Apji Dalel Singh
Jai Narayan Vyas
Mukat Behari Lal Bhargava
Gokulbhai Bhatt

References

See also
List of people by India state

Rajasthan

People